Sounds of My Life is the fifth studio album by Taiwanese Mandopop singer-songwriter William Wei. It was released on April 29, 2020, by The Orchard. Production was done by Wei with Aven Tsai, alongside a variety of collaborators including Derrick Sepnio, Fergus Chew, Cheng Yang Chung, Shang-Chien Chiang and Zell Huang. The theme behind the album circles around Wei's 'Documentary of Sounds' as he translates his life and emotions into music. Musically, the pop album combined a variety of genres in his album, from pop, folk, R&B to even rock. The album is specially dedicated in memory of Wei's grandmother.

The album generally received favorable reviews from music critics. Upon its release, the physical album reached number 1 on all sales charts in Taiwan. Sounds of My Life received 4 nominations at the 32nd Golden Melody Awards, including Album of the Year and Best Mandarin Album.
Wei was nominated for Best Male Mandarin Singer and "I Wrote A Song For You" earned Wei a nomination for Best Composition.

Track listing

Critical reception 

Upon its release, Sounds Of My Life received generally acclaims from domestic and international music critics. QQ Music listed the album as one of the top albums in 2020, and it praised Wei for "masterfully incorporating sounds from his daily life into the songs, bringing the album to life". The Straits Times gave the album 4 out of 5 stars, and it wrote "the album can be a little sprawling and unwieldy at times, but then again, so is life." Writing for United Daily News, Zhao Ya-fen described the album as "a documentary-like music album with tremendous efforts in production translating into fine masterpieces“. Jocelle from Asia Pop Daily gave the album 4.5 out of 5 stars, reasoning that she was not disappointed: "the album is everything I expected and more; a tidy yet extravagant compilation of Wei’s experiences, values and principles into a seamless and greatly moving listening experience." She also wrote that "Wei has managed the near impossible; to create a technically wonderful work that does not isolate the average listener". Sounds Of My Life was also named as one of the top 10 best albums of 2020 by Hit FM.

Music videos

References

2020 albums
William Wei albums